Jean-Michel Bertrand (6 June 1943 at Baccarat, Meurthe-et-Moselle – 19 February 2008 at the Hôpital Saint-Louis in Paris) was a French politician of the Union for a Popular Movement (UMP).

Biography 
A pharmacist by occupation, Jean-Michel Bertrand was elected mayor of Bourg-en-Bresse on 25 March 2001, then MP on 16 June 2002, for the twelfth legislature (2002–2007).

During his political career he was a member of the Council on National Road Safety (Conseil national de sécurité routière CNSR), and made 38 proposals on such issues.

For health reasons, Jean-Michel Bertrand was not a candidate re-election in 2007. Xavier Breton, 1st assistant to the mayor of Bourg-en-Bresse, was elected MP on 17 June 2007.

Sometimes nicknamed "the bulldozer of the Dombes" for municipal action, Jean-Michel Bertrand died on 19 February 2008 aged 64. He was suffering from a Myelodysplastic syndrome.

Awards
By decree of the President dated 30 January 2008, Jean-Michel Bertrand was made a Knight of the Legion of Honour.

References

1943 births
2008 deaths
Deaths from myelodysplastic syndrome
People from Meurthe-et-Moselle
Politicians from Grand Est
Rally for the Republic politicians
Union for a Popular Movement politicians
Deputies of the 12th National Assembly of the French Fifth Republic
Deputies for Ain (French Fifth Republic)
Mayors of places in Auvergne-Rhône-Alpes
Chevaliers of the Légion d'honneur